Vorticella convallaria is a species of ciliates. It forms part of the V. convallaria species complex. V. citrina is lemon yellow to light green in colour.

External links
Freshwater and terrestrial microbes of Idaho: Vorticella citrina

Oligohymenophorea
Species described in 1786